Black Mesa is a mesa in the White Mountains of Navajo County, Arizona. Located on the Navajo Nation, it is just off State Route 77 between Snowflake and Show Low.

References

Landforms of Navajo County, Arizona
Mesas of Arizona
Mountains of Navajo County, Arizona
Navajo Nation